Kurt Kendall Coleman is a South African rugby union player who currently plays fly-half for Rugby ATL in Major League Rugby (MLR).

Professional career

After eight appearances in that competition, he was called up into the  squad for the 2011 Super Rugby season. He made a further four appearances for the Stormers, including three starts.

He failed to break into the Stormers team for the 2012 Super Rugby season, instead representing Western Province in the Vodacom Cup, where he scored 44 points in 10 games.

In December 2019 Rugby ATL of Major League Rugby announced that Coleman had signed to play with them for the 2020 season.

Super Rugby Statistics

References

External links
 
 itsrugby.co.uk profile

Living people
1990 births
South African rugby union players
Rugby union fly-halves
Stormers players
People from Knysna
Western Province (rugby union) players
SWD Eagles players
Southern Kings players
Rugby ATL players
Rugby union players from the Western Cape